Bride Wars is a 2009 American romantic comedy film directed by Gary Winick and written by Greg DePaul, June Diane Raphael, and Casey Wilson. The film stars Kate Hudson and Anne Hathaway with Kristen Johnston, Steve Howey, Bryan Greenberg and Candice Bergen in supporting roles. In the film, two childhood best friends, who have made many plans together for their respective weddings, turn into sworn enemies in a race to get married before the other.

Bride Wars was theatrically released on January 9, 2009, by 20th Century Fox. The film was panned by the critics but became a box office success grossing $114.7 million on a $30 million budget. A Chinese remake of the same name was released in 2015.

Plot
Emma Allan and Olivia "Liv" Lerner are childhood best friends who have planned every detail of their weddings, since first witnessing a wedding 20 years ago at the Plaza Hotel. They both have made it a top priority to be married in the same location in June. While hanging out at Liv's apartment in the present day they find a Tiffany box hidden in the closet. Both friends are excited knowing that Liv will soon get a proposal from her boyfriend. That same night Emma's boyfriend proposes to her at home over a Chinese takeout dinner. Liv gets restless waiting for her boyfriend to pop the question and eventually confronts him at his office the morning after Emma's engagement. He replies he was planning on doing it that night but then asks her on the spot.

Both women start planning and expect to be each other's maid of honor. They schedule a meeting with New York's most famous wedding planner, Marion St. Claire, who tells them there are three spots open at The Plaza in June: Two on the same day and one a few weeks later. They each choose a different day, but due to a clerical error, wind up both scheduled to have their weddings on the same day, June 6 (three and a half months later).

The two of them ask the third bride, Stacey, to switch her June 27 date with Emma. Stacey refuses, resulting in Liv fighting with Stacey while she is registering for gifts and causing Liv and Emma to be escorted out of the store. A week of passive-aggressive hostility passes before the two women make it clear to each other that neither will compromise. Emma's fiancé, Fletcher, begins to show signs of being controlling. The two women declare war after a slight misunderstanding that Liv already announced her wedding date, outraging Emma who set her date as well, which Liv becomes aware of at their shared bridal shower. The two exchange threats and insults in front of their friends who decide not to take sides.

Both attempt to sabotage the other's wedding with such antics as: Liv changing Emma's dance instructor, Emma secretly sending Liv candy to make her too fat to fit into her dress, Liv making Emma's spray tan bright orange, Emma changing Liv's hair dye to a shocking blue-white color, Liv registering Emma on Babies R Us and spreading rumors that she is pregnant. The end result is Emma showing up to Liv's invite-only bachelorette party to outdance her on stage.

Emma and Fletcher get into an argument regarding Emma's maniacal behavior, sabotaging Liv's wedding and their friendship, and how Emma has changed since they first met. The couple undergoes strains in their relationship because of Emma's newfound outspokenness and self-confidence. In contrast, Liv has learned to be more sensitive and expressive. However, due to her stress about the wedding and strained friendship with Emma, she ends up being demoted from her job as an attorney.

Both brides-to-be are shown to be in the Plaza very shortly before they are due to be wed, separately. Right before Liv leaves to begin her march to the altar, she encounters Emma's father and receives his blessing; immediately she regrets setting up a wild spring break DVD to play at Emma's wedding. She sends her assistant Kevin to replace the DVD with the right one, filled with childhood memories. Thinking that the DVD is for a prank, he does not do so. Before the brides enter their respective venues, they share a brief moment of reconciliation as they both smile at each other.

Emma begins her walk down the aisle but stops when the footage of her spring break is shown. She loses her temper and tackles Liv at her wedding on the other side. The two brides wrestle in their dresses on the floor to the shock of the guests, Fletcher, and Emma's parents who are standing in the doorway. Emma stands up and walks over to Fletcher who is upset at her behavior. Emma tells him that she is not the same person he fell in love with 10 years ago and that she has changed over the years. With that, the two decide to call off their wedding. Liv's wedding resumes after the two friends talk things out and reconcile. Emma, now Liv's maid of honor, is later and dancing with Nate, Liv's brother, and a well-known magazine journalist.

The film picks up a year later when Liv and Emma meet up for drinks, where it's revealed that Emma married Nate. Liv offers a toast to marriage but Emma says she's not drinking. When Liv says she's not either, it dawns on them that they are pregnant and their due dates are the same: March 3. The best friends squeal with excitement and hug happily.

Cast
 Kate Hudson as Olivia "Liv" Lerner, a successful attorney at Ropes & Gray who is used to getting her way, and won't settle for anything else. She attempts to be perfect instead of taking things lightly, ever since her parents died when she was a child. It was shown that she is protective and extremely caring of Emma.
 Zoe O'Grady as Young Liv
 Anne Hathaway as Emma Allan, a middle school teacher who takes care of everyone, but forgets about having some time for herself due to her sweet but slightly meek nature. Liv remarked that she is the one who always "gives in" when they both have conflicts with each other.
 Shannon Ferber as Young Emma
 Chris Pratt as Fletcher Flemson, Emma's fiancé. Fletcher is an accountant and the two of them met ten years prior to the film's events. Throughout the film, he is shown to be very controlling, becoming aggravated by Emma's assertive behavior, and begins to have a lot of differences with her.
 Steve Howey as Daniel Williams, Liv's fiancé and a hedge fund manager. Unlike Fletcher and Emma, he became closer with Liv during the wedding planning process and embraced his fiancé's changes in her attitude particularly her newly discovered vulnerability.
 Bryan Greenberg as Nathan "Nate" Lerner, Liv's brother who is in love with Emma.
 Candice Bergen as Marion St. Claire, New York's most sought-after wedding planner, to whom both women turn when planning their wedding. She also serves as the narrator of the story.
 Kristen Johnston as Deb Delgado, an obnoxious, lazy woman who is one of Emma's colleagues. She continually unloads her entire workload on Emma. She eventually becomes Emma's maid of honor. She is the one who suggested to Emma that she should fatten Liv with expensive chocolates, and other calorie laden treats.
 Michael Arden as Kevin, Liv's assistant at work, whom she recruits to be her "Mister of Honor." He gave Liv the suggestion that she should mess up with Emma's dance lessons by replacing her instructor with an eccentric one. He is seen getting romantically involved with Amie near the end of the film.
 June Diane Raphael as Amanda, a friend of Emma and Liv's who gets married at the start of the film. She is shown to be frank and expresses her regret in getting married in comical ways, ending with her and her husband getting divorced at the end of the film.
 Casey Wilson as Stacy Kindred, another bride and one of Marion St. Claire's clients. Liv and Emma tried to persuade her to give up her date, which ends up in a fiasco in a store.
 Paul Scheer as Ricky Coo, dance choreographer who calls himself "The Doctor of Dance".
 John Pankow as John Allan, Emma's dad.
 Hettienne Park as Marissa, one of Emma and Liv's closest friends.
 Lauren Bittner as Amie, one of Emma and Liv's closest friends. She is seen getting romantically involved with Kevin near the end of the film.
 Dennis Parlato as Dance Instructor
 Billy Unger as Additional voices
 Colin Ford  as Additional voices

Production
Raphael and Wilson completed the shooting script of Bride Wars, from an original screenplay by Greg DePaul, before the 2007–2008 Writers Guild of America strike began. Karen McCullah Lutz and Kirsten Smith also contributed to the screenplay.

Some principal photography took place at the Peabody Essex Museum in Salem, Massachusetts. Most filming occurred in Boston, New York City, and in Salem, Massachusetts.

Music
The score to Bride Wars was composed by Edward Shearmur, who recorded his score with a 77-piece ensemble of the Hollywood Studio Symphony at the Newman Scoring Stage at 20th Century Fox.

In the beginning of the film, the song "Somethin' Special" by Colbie Caillat was played, however this version had different lyrics than the Beijing Olympic Mix, suggesting that it was the original mix. As the film did not have a soundtrack, the original version remained unreleased until Caillat's album Breakthrough was released, where the song appears as a bonus track on the Rhapsody edition. There is also the song "Dream" by Priscilla Ahn and "Scared" by Duffy.

Reception

Box office
In its opening weekend, the film grossed $21.1 million, ranking at number 2 at the box office. It went on to gross $58.7 million in the United States and Canada, $56.7 million in other countries, for a total of $115.4 million worldwide.

Critical response
On Rotten Tomatoes the film has an approval rating of 11% based on 147 reviews, with an average rating of 3.50/10. The site's critics consensus reads, "Bride Wars takes the already wearisome concept of battling bridezillas, and makes it thoroughly insufferable via a lazy script and wholly detestable characters." On Metacritic the film has a weighted average score of 24 out of 100 based on 30 critics, indicating "generally unfavorable reviews". Audiences polled by CinemaScore gave the film an average grade of "A–" on an A+ to F scale. Time named it one of the top 10 worst chick flicks ever made.

Manohla Dargis of The New York Times called the film "dopey if largely painless". She said that Hathaway's presence meant "that there's a little acting in it, along with a few human emotions" and wondered what the film might have been if the writers had explored a potential lesbian subtext suggested by the opening scenes. Carrie Rickey of The Philadelphia Inquirer wrote, "How bad can a movie be, with Goldilocks Hudson and Cinderella Hathaway? So excruciating that Hudson's sunshine can't warm it and Hathaway's rose redolence can't mask its stink." Ty Burr of The Boston Globe was disturbed by the film, claiming that it was "...a chick flick that makes its chick characters — and by extension its chick audience — look like hateful, backward toddlers, and there is something wrong with that."

Longtime BBC Radio 5 Live critic Mark Kermode was notably harsh toward the film on his Kermode and Mayo's Film Review show, going so far as to say that he would quit film criticism if Bride Wars did not end up in his list of 10 worst films of 2009. By the end of the year, even when Kermode included Terminator Salvation and Couples Retreat on his list by popular demand, Bride Wars still finished eighth, allowing him to keep his job.

In one of the few positive reviews of the film, Time critic Mary Pols wrote, "At least, and this is something to be grateful for, Bride Wars deviates from the usual wedding-flick routine of maids of honor who should be the bride (or groom). And even though the catfighting goes over the top, the notion that a passionate female friendship can turn ugly in a heartbeat is, sadly, realistic."

Awards
The film was nominated for 2 awards at the 2009 MTV Movie Awards: Best Fight (Anne Hathaway vs. Kate Hudson) and Anne Hathaway for Best Female Performance. It also had several Teen Choice Award nominations. Candice Bergen was nominated for a Razzie Award as Worst Supporting Actress for her performance in the film.

 Won
 2009 - Teen Choice Awards for Choice Comedy Movie Actress (Anne Hathaway)

 Nominated
 2009 - Teen Choice Awards for Choice Comedy Movie Actress (Kate Hudson)
 2009 - Teen Choice Awards for Choice Movie Hissy Fit (Kate Hudson)
 2009 - Teen Choice Awards for Choice Movie Rockstar Moment (Anne Hathaway)
 2009 - Teen Choice Awards for Choice Movie Rumble (Anne Hathaway) & (Kate Hudson)
 2009 - MTV Movie Awards for Best Female Performance (Anne Hathaway)
 2009 - MTV Movie Awards for Best Fight (Anne Hathaway) & (Kate Hudson)
 2010 - Razzie Awards for Worst Supporting Actress (Candice Bergen)
 2010 - People's Choice Awards for Favourite Comedy Movie

References

External links

 
 
 

2000s buddy comedy films
2000s English-language films
2000s female buddy films
2009 romantic comedy films
2009 films
20th Century Fox films
American buddy comedy films
American black comedy films
American female buddy films
American films about revenge
American romantic comedy films
Dune Entertainment films
Films about weddings in the United States
Films directed by Gary Winick
Films scored by Edward Shearmur
Films set in Manhattan
Films shot in Boston
Films shot in New York City
Regency Enterprises films
2000s American films